The Battle for the Valley Trophy is a Fresno State–San Jose State football rivalry and is a college football rivalry between the Fresno State Bulldogs football team of California State University, Fresno and the San Jose State Spartans football team of San José State University. The two teams currently play annual, regularly scheduled contests as Mountain West Conference (West Division) opponents. 

Since 1921, Fresno State and San Jose State have shared conference affiliation in numerous athletics conferences including the California Coast Conference, Far Western Conference, California Collegiate Athletic Association, Big West Conference, and the Western Athletic Conference.

The rivalry is likely rooted in the two schools' relatively close proximity to one another in the state of California. The city of Fresno is located approximately 150 miles south of San Jose. Both institutions are also members of the California State University system. 

Additionally, Fresno State and San Jose State are both located in geographical valleys. Fresno is located in the agricultural San Joaquin Valley while San Jose is located in the Santa Clara Valley, which is now more widely known as Silicon Valley. The locations of the two schools account for the names Valley Cup, Valley Bowl and Battle for the Valley Trophy. 

As of 2022, Fresno State leads the series 44-38-3.

Historical overview

San Jose State led the series from 1949 to 2001, but Fresno State tied it at 32–32–3 with a victory in 2002 and recaptured the lead in 2003. The Bulldogs and Spartans first played each other in 1921.

The rivalry took a one-year break in 2012 after conference realignment temporarily separated the two schools, with Fresno State moving to the Mountain West Conference while San Jose State stayed in the Western Athletic Conference. It resumed as a conference rivalry in 2013 when San Jose State joined the Mountain West, and is assured of being an annual matchup since both schools are in the West Division.

Beginning in 2013, the winner of the game is awarded the Valley Trophy.

Statistics

Game results

See also  
 List of NCAA college football rivalry games

References

College football rivalries in the United States
Fresno State Bulldogs football
San Jose State Spartans football
1921 establishments in California